Franco González may refer to:

 Franco González (footballer, born 1998), Argentine midfielder
 Franco González (footballer, born 1999), Argentine midfielder